'Franchise consulting' traditionally meant the same consultant-to-client relationship as any other industry wherein the consultant charges a 'fee for services'. But, as of the late 1990s the term 'consultant' has been adopted by many franchise salesmen and brokers who represent themselves as 'free' consultants to prospective franchise buyers. These franchise brokers provide introduction services for franchise sellers with whom they have worked out a pay-for-sale agreement. 

Some franchise consultants charge clients an upfront or ongoing fee for finding and analyzing franchises to buy regardless of compensation from the franchisor. 

Franchise development consultants assist businesses in becoming a franchisor. They also might support with improving operations, marketing and sales of existing franchise systems.

For Franchise Buyers

Franchise Broker (paid by seller) 
Much like a real estate agent, a franchise broker typically charges no upfront fees to "buyers" (franchisees); instead, he or she receives the bulk of his or her income from "sellers" (franchisors). 

The role of the franchise broker is to build a win-win relationship between the franchisor and the potential franchisee.  There are numerous franchise consulting firms that have a large footprint in the franchising industry and have referral agreements set up with 400+ franchises. Franchise brokers receive a commission of up to 50% or more of the franchise fee the buyer pays to the franchise company.  

The potential buyer would pay exactly the same franchise fee as he or she would pay if they had contacted the same franchise on their own.  It is illegal for the franchisor to charge anything additional for the use of a Franchise Consultant unless this is disclosed in the Franchise Disclosure Document (FDD).  

Franchise brokers often screen out underqualified candidates and only introduce to franchisors screened candidates that fit their business model.  Many franchises are not concerned with paying the consultant/ broker a percentage of the initial franchise fee because they are looking at the long term residual value of ongoing royalties from the franchisee.

How to Start a Franchise Your Business is an overall guide related to the strategy, model and overall impact of how franchising could scale your brand and expand your business.

Franchise Consultant (paid by buyer) 
There are franchise consultants who charge a fee to prospective buyers for the purpose of assisting with pre-purchase due diligence. Franchisors and franchise brokers enjoy a distinct advantage over an inexperienced buyer. Using a fee for service consultant tends to give a buyer greater insight into a franchise opportunity under consideration. 

Many franchisors do not work with franchise brokers and that is so for many reasons. It could be a seasoned sales staff already in place, a decision not to pay large commissions to brokers for a lead, or the desire to handle all prospects internally from initial meeting to sale.

Franchise Attorney (paid by buyer) 
There are many licensed franchise attorneys who will consult/represent the franchisee or the franchisor under a fee agreement.  Attorneys cannot take fees from franchisors and consult with the franchisee at the same time because this would represent a conflict of interest for an attorney under state laws.  A consultant package from an attorney will, of course, be expensive, but the attorney has the incentive and the duty under the law to "vet" the franchisor and perform "due diligence" on the offering on behalf of his/her client when he/she offers a consultant package to a client.

For Franchisors

Franchise Consulting Firms 
Smaller and more pragmatic consultancy practices may work much closer with smaller businesses to franchise their business over time.  This enables the business to begin franchising their business much sooner, often within 2 years of successful operation of a local model.   

Services provided for new franchisors might include:   

 Franchise legal documentation (generally in conjunction with a licensed franchise attorney)
 Franchise operatorios and training support
 Franchise sales material 
 Franchise sales training 
 Website development 
 Online marketing for franchise buyers
 Online marketing for end consumers
 Franchise compliance training

Franchise consultants might also provide services to existing franchise systems that are looking to expand and improve operational efficiencies. Further services provided to these franchisors include: 

 Franchise marketing material 
 Franchise sales coaching (to franchise brokers and internal salesmen employed by franchisor)
 Operation manuals 
 Strategizing on best utilization and implementation of money from the advertising fund
 International expansion

See also
Franchise Disclosure Document
Franchise fraud
Franchising
Franchise agreement
The Franchise Rule
Franchise termination

References

Franchising
Management consulting